John Crosse may refer to:

John Crosse (antiquary) (1786–1833), British antiquary and music writer
John Crosse (announcer) (born c. 1939), British former radio DJ and announcer
John Crosse (priest) (1739–1816), English evangelical cleric
John Green Crosse (1790–1850), British surgeon
Sir John Crosse, 2nd Baronet (c. 1700–1762), British baronet and Member of Parliament

See also
John Cross (disambiguation)
Crosse (surname)